Plánice is a town in Klatovy District in the Plzeň Region of the Czech Republic. It has about 1,600 inhabitants.

Administrative parts
Villages of Bližanovy, Křížovice, Kvasetice, Lovčice, Mlynářovice, Nová Plánice, Pohoří, Štipoklasy, Vracov, Zbyslav and Zdebořice are administrative parts of Plánice. Mlynářovice forms an exclave of the municipal territory.

Geography
It lies in the Blatná Uplands. The town is situated on the left bank of the Úslava River. There are several small ponds in the territory.

History
The first written mention of Plánice is from 1144, when it was property of the newly established monastery of Pomuk. As a town, Plánice was first mentioned in 1329. During its history, the town was owned by the noble families of Schwamberg, Sternberg, Rožmitál and Martinic.

Sights

The landmark of Plánice is the Church of Saint Blaise. The original Gothic church was first documented in 1352. It was demolished and in 1755–1757, it was replaced by the current Baroque building. It was built by the architect Anselmo Lurago, probably according to the plans of Kilian Ignaz Dientzenhofer.

Plánice Castle was originally a fortress, built in the second half of the 16th century. At the beginning of the 18th century, it was rebuilt into the early Baroque castle. Today it is owned by the town and inaccessible to the public.

Notable people
František Křižík (1847–1941), engineer and inventor

Twin towns – sister cities

Plánice is twinned with:
 Rubigen, Switzerland

References

External links

Cities and towns in the Czech Republic
Populated places in Klatovy District